The Samsung Galaxy Note 20 and Galaxy Note 20 Ultra (stylized and marketed as Samsung Galaxy Note20 and Galaxy Note20 Ultra) are a series of high-end Android-based phablets designed, developed, produced, and marketed by Samsung Electronics as part of their Samsung Galaxy Note series, succeeding the Samsung Galaxy Note 10 series. The phablets were announced on 5 August 2020 alongside the Samsung Galaxy Z Fold 2, Galaxy Watch 3, Galaxy Buds Live and Samsung Galaxy Tab S7 during Samsung's Unpacked Event. It was the final model in the Galaxy Note series, with Samsung beginning to integrate the functionality from the Note series into its S series "Ultra" models, starting with the Galaxy S22 Ultra.

Due to restrictions of the COVID-19 pandemic on public and social gatherings, the Note 20 range was unveiled virtually at Samsung's newsroom in South Korea. At the event, Samsung announced that the smartphones include support for 5G connectivity, which allows for higher-bandwidth and lower-latency mobile connections where 5G network coverage is available. The Note 20's S-Pen has up to 4× better latency than that of previous generations. Mystic Green, Mystic Bronze, and Mystic Grey are colour options for the Note 20; Mystic Bronze, Mystic Black and Mystic White are colour options for the Note 20 Ultra. Unlike its predecessor, the Note 20 range does not feature a "+" model.

The Galaxy Note 20 series also include a number of new software features, which include performance optimization for mobile gaming, wireless sync with desktop and laptop PCs, and improved DeX features for remotely connected to compatible devices.

Design 
The Galaxy Note 20 series maintains a similar design with the Galaxy Note 10 and Galaxy S20, with an Infinity-O display (first introduced on the Galaxy S10) containing a circular punch hole in the top center for the frontal selfie camera. The rear camera array is located in the corner with a rectangular protrusion like the Galaxy S20, housing three cameras.

Unlike their predecessors, the Note 20 Ultra is the first Samsung phone that uses stainless steel as the frame material, while the regular Note 20 sticks to the more classic anodized aluminum. The Note 20 uses Gorilla Glass 5 for the screen; the back panel is reinforced polycarbonate, which has not been seen on a Note series phone since the Note 4 and Note Edge. The Note 20 Ultra has Gorilla Glass Victus for the screen. Global color options are, Mystic Bronze, Mystic Grey, Mystic Green, Mystic Black and Mystic White. Moreover, the Mystic Green, Mystic Bronze and Mystic Grey color options on the Note 20, have a matte finish, whereas, only the Mystic Bronze on the Note 20 Ultra, has a matte finish. Mystic Bronze is available on both models, whereas Mystic Grey and Mystic Green, are limited to the Note 20; Mystic Black and Mystic Crush White are limited to the Note 20 Ultra. For the Note 20, Aura Red is exclusive to SK Telecom with 256 GB of storage, replacing Mystic Green in South Korea; Prism Blue will be sold in India.

Specifications

Hardware

Chipsets 
The Galaxy Note 20 line comprises two models with various hardware specifications; international models of the Note 20 utilize the Exynos 990 system-on-chip, while the United States, Korean and Chinese models utilize the Qualcomm Snapdragon 865+. Both of the SoCs are based on a 7 nm+ processing technology node. The Exynos chipset comes with the Mali-G77 MP11 GPU, whereas the Snapdragon chipset comes with the Adreno 650 GPU.

Display 
The Galaxy Note 20 does not feature a curved display like the one found on the Note 20 Ultra. The Note 20 and Note 20 Ultra feature a 6.7-inch 1080p and 6.9-inch 1440p display, respectively. Both use an AMOLED with HDR10+ support and "dynamic tone mapping" technology, marketed as Super AMOLED Plus for the Note 20 and Dynamic AMOLED 2X for the Note 20 Ultra. The Note 20 has a fixed 60 Hz refresh rate, however, the Note 20 Ultra offers a variable 120 Hz refresh rate. The settings have two options, 60 Hz and Adaptive, the latter of which uses a variable refresh rate that can adjust based on the content being displayed, enabled by a more energy efficient LTPO backplane. Unlike the S20 series, the display will remain at 120 Hz regardless of the device's battery level, and can handle slightly higher temperatures before switching to 60 Hz. Adaptive mode is limited to a FHD resolution, requiring users to switch to 60 Hz mode to enable QHD resolution. Both models utilize an ultrasonic in-screen fingerprint sensor.

Storage 
The base amount of RAM is 8 GB, paired with 128 or 256 GB of internal storage standard. The Note 20 Ultra has 12 GB RAM and 512 GB UFS options, and has up to 1 TB of expandable storage via the microSD card slot.

Batteries 
The Note 20 and Note 20 Ultra use non-removable Li-Ion batteries, rated at 4300 mAh and 4500 mAh respectively.

Qi inductive charging is supported as well as the ability to charge other Qi-compatible device from the Note 20's own battery power, which is branded as "Samsung PowerShare"; wired charging is supported over USB-C at up to 25 W.

Connectivity 
The two come with 5G standard connectivity, though some regions may have special LTE or sub-6 GHz only variants, and both omit the audio jack.

It has NFC, eSIM, and Ultra-wideband technology.

On April 14, 2021, the Galaxy Note20 Ultra 5G T-Mobile updated software to support eSIM and dual SIM (DSDS). Other carriers still do not enable the two features even though the Galaxy Note20 Ultra already supports eSIM out of the box.

Cameras 

The Note 20 features similar camera specifications to that of the Samsung Galaxy S20, which include a 12 MP wide sensor with 1.8 aperture, a 64 MP telephoto sensor with 2.0 aperture, and a 12 MP ultrawide sensor with 12 mm equivalent focal length. The telephoto camera supports 3× hybrid optical zoom and 10× digital zoom, which combined enables 30× hybrid zoom.

The Note 20 Ultra has a more advanced camera setup than its counterpart, including a 108 MP wide sensor, a 12 MP "periscope" telephoto sensor, and a 12 MP ultrawide sensor. The telephoto camera has a focal length of 120 mm (35mm equivalent), which equals 5× optical zoom, and allows for 50× hybrid zoom (assisted by digital zoom). Laser autofocus is used in favor of the S20 Ultra's time-of-flight camera.

The Note 20's telephoto sensor and the Note 20 Ultra's wide sensor use pixel binning to output higher quality images at a standard resolution, with the wide-angle sensor using Nonacell technology which groups 3x3 pixels to capture more light.

The front camera uses a 10 MP sensor, and can record 4K video.

Single Take, introduced on the S20 series, allows users to capture photos or videos simultaneously with different sensors automatically. Both models can record 8K video at 24fps. On the Note 20, this is enabled by the 64 MP telephoto sensor, whereas the Note 20 Ultra's 108 MP wide sensor natively supports 8K video.

S-Pen 
The S-Pen has better latency at 26ms on the Note 20 and 9ms on the Note 20 Ultra, reduced from 42ms on the Note 10 and Note 10+. Additionally, it gains five new Air gestures that work across the UI by utilizing the accelerometers and gyroscope, as well as 'AI-based point prediction'. Battery life has also been improved from 10 hours to 24 hours.

Accessories 
Earbuds are included in some countries such as the UK, but are not bundled in others such as the US.

Software 

The devices was shipped with Android 10 and One UI 2.5. A beta test for Android 11 was released later on in the year. Android 11 with One UI 3.0 has been sent OTA (over-the-air) to the majority of Note 20 and Note 20 Ultra devices as of January 2021. Both the Note 20 and Note 20 Ultra are expected to get the Android 12 update with One UI 4.0. Beta versions were released also for the two phones.

Software support
On August 18, 2020, the Note 20 series along with a selection of other Samsung Galaxy devices, were announced to receive three generations of Android software update support.

Xbox Game Pass 
Samsung has partnered with Xbox to offer Xbox games on the Note 20. In certain markets, the Galaxy Note 20 has been offered with three months of free Xbox game pass along with an Xbox game pad; Xbox games will be playable from the phone to the TV. More than 90 Xbox games are playable on the Note 20.

Reception 
The Note 20 received mixed reviews. Reviews from various technology websites, such as TechRadar and The Verge, praised the Note 20 series for its redesigned S-Pen and camera performance. However, the baseline Note 20 was criticized for its lower quality display and plastic back panel despite the high starting price point. Writing for TechRadar, James Peckham said in his verdict, "the Galaxy Note 20 is Samsung's new entry-level stylus-included smartphone for 2020, but it's one that doesn't seem particularly exciting for the usual Note-loving crowd. It highlights some more affordable features compared to its more exciting Ultra sibling but it may well be just as good for those who don’t want to spend top dollar." There was a pronounced difference in the performance of the two processors available, which caused concern that Exynos models were an inferior product, as the differentials were not as large in previous models. The cooling system introduced in the Galaxy Note 10 was also  removed in the Snapdragon Variants of the Note 20 series.

See also 
 Samsung Galaxy S20
 Samsung Galaxy Z Fold 2
 Samsung Galaxy Note series

References

External links 
 

Samsung smartphones
Samsung mobile phones
Samsung Galaxy
20
Mobile phones with stylus
Mobile phones with 8K video recording
Mobile phones with multiple rear cameras
Mobile phones introduced in 2020
Discontinued smartphones